The Korea Tourism Organization (KTO) is an organization of the Republic of Korea (South Korea) under the Ministry of Culture and Tourism. It is commissioned to promote the country's tourism industry.

The KTO was established in 1962 as a government-invested corporation responsible for the South Korean tourism industry according to the International Tourism Corporation Act. The organization promotes Korea as a tourist destination to attract foreign tourists. Starting in the 1980s, domestic tourism promotion also became a function of the KTO.

Inbound visitors totaled over 6 million in 2006 and the tourism industry is said to be one of the factors that has some influence on the Korean economy.

History 
1961: The Tourism Promotion Law is enacted.
1962: The International Tourism Corporation (ITC) is established to promote South Korea’s tourism industry through the management of major hotels, taxis and the Korea Travel Bureau, as well as by training human resources to support the travel trade.
1968: The number of foreign visitors passes 100,000.
1969: The Hotel Institute is opened. The first overseas office opens in Tokyo.
1971: Development of Bomun Lake Resort in Gyeongju begins.
1977: London office opens in the UK.
1978: Korea attracts over one million foreign visitors.
1982: The International Tourism Corporation is renamed the Korea National Tourism Corporation (KNTC).
1988: The number of foreign visitors surpasses two million.
1991: The number of foreign visitors passes three million.
1996: The company’s name is changed from Korea National Tourism Corporation to Korea National Tourism Organization.
1998: Kumgangsan Diamond Mountains tour begins.
2000: Korea attracts five million foreign visitors.
2003: Kumgangsan Diamond Mountains land route tour begins. Hallyu (Korea Wave) becomes the major theme of the KTO's overseas marketing. United States branch offices issue newsletter bulletins; offices are in Los Angeles and New York City.
2005: KTO reshuffles its organizational structure into six divisions. KTO introduces its new corporate identity. Korea attracts 6.5 million visitors from abroad.

See also 

 Seoul Tourism Organization

References

External links
 VisitKorea (KTO) homepage 

Tourism in South Korea
Government agencies of South Korea
1962 establishments in South Korea
Tourism agencies
Government agencies established in 1962